Giovanni Carlo Boschi (Faenza, 9 April 1715 – 6 September 1788) was an Italian clergyman who was made a cardinal by Pope Clement XIII in the consistory of 21 July 1766. He then served as Major Penitentiary from 1767 to 1788, and  participated in the papal conclaves of 1769 and 1774–75.  In the latter, the jus exclusivae was used on behalf of the Bourbons to veto his election to the papacy. His other offices included prefect of the Congregation for the correction of the books of the Oriental Church.

References

External links
http://www.catholic-hierarchy.org/bishop/bbosc.html 

1715 births
1788 deaths
People from Faenza
18th-century Italian cardinals
Major Penitentiaries of the Apostolic Penitentiary